See:
WMG Academy for Young Engineers, Coventry
WMG Academy for Young Engineers, Solihull